Victor Adolphe Malte-Brun (25 November 1816 – 13 July 1889) was a French geographer and cartographer.

Biography

He was born in Paris, France, the son of Conrad Malte-Brun, another geographer, of Danish origin, and founder of the Société de Géographie. After having been professor of history in several colleges, he devoted himself especially to geographical studies.

In 1851, Victor Adolphe Malte-Brun became a member of the Société de Géographie, and quickly rose to be its secretary-general. He was also principal editor of the Nouvelles Annales des Voyage.

He died in Marcoussis in the Essonne département and is buried in the Cimetière du Montparnasse in Paris.

Legacy

His name was given to the street in Marcoussis where he once lived.

Mount Malte-Brun in New Zealand's Southern Alps was named, by Sir Julius von Haast, after him.

Partial bibliography
 Jeunes voyageurs en France (1840)
 Destinée de Sir John Franklin dévoilée (1860)
 Nouvelles acquisitions des Russes dans l'Asie orientale (1861)
 Les États-Unis et le Mexique (1862)
 Coup d'œil sur le Yucatan (1864)
 Sonora et ses mines (1864)
 Canal interocéanique du Darien (1865)
 Histoire de Marcoussis (History of Marcoussis) (1867)
 Histoire géographique et statistique de l'Allemagne (4to, 1866-'8)
 La France illustrée (Illustrated France, volumes I and V, 1882)
He also published a revised edition of his father's geography (8 vols., 1852–55).

References

External links
 Picture of Mount Maltebrun

Scientists from Paris
French cartographers
French geographers
French people of Danish descent
History of geography
1816 births
1889 deaths
Burials at Montparnasse Cemetery
19th-century French people